Crescent Point Place, formerly the Weyburn Colosseum, is an indoor arena located in Weyburn, Saskatchewan. It was built in 1960 and is home to the Weyburn Red Wings of the SJHL. The building's capacity is 1,495 plus 250 standing. It was used by the Red Wings during their short stint in the Western Hockey League as well. The arena has been completely renovated, featuring a number of luxury boxes, media center, NHL style home dressing room, and a very spacious, newly renovated lobby area.    

Indoor arenas in Saskatchewan
Indoor ice hockey venues in Canada
Sports venues in Saskatchewan
Western Hockey League arenas
Weyburn